Goniorhynchus marasmialis is a moth in the family Crambidae. It was described by George Hampson in 1898. It is found on the islands of Bali and Timor in Maritime Southeast Asia.

References

Moths described in 1898
Spilomelinae